When the Woman Butts In is a 1959 Czechoslovak comedy film directed by Zdeněk Podskalský. It was entered into the 1960 Cannes Film Festival.

Plot 
The study of Dr Frantisek Prucha, who bears the nickname Faust, is located in Faust's House, now converted into a hospital. Dr Prucha is worn out from overwork, thus he does not even notice the interest he is generating among the surrounding women. One of them unexpectedly appears at one of his lectures. In her red dress, she looks like Mephistopheles dressed as a woman, and Faust privately calls her Mephistopheles. After he returns home, under strange circumstances, he finds her in his room, and he begins to think he is suffering from hallucinations.

Cast
 Miroslav Horníček as Dr. Faust
 Jana Hlaváčová as Mefistofela
 Vlastimil Brodský as Borovička, Gastle Guide
 Jiří Sovák as Mayor Hatl
 Rudolf Hrušínský as Dr. Wagner
 Bohumil Bezouška as Driver
 Josef Příhoda as Man with Candle

References

External links
 

1959 films
Czechoslovak comedy films
1950s Czech-language films
1959 comedy films
Films directed by Zdeněk Podskalský
Czech comedy films
1950s Czech films